Burak Kaçar (born 18 November 1994), better known by his stage name Zen-G, is a Turkish rapper and songwriter.

Life and career 
He was born in 1994, in Istanbul. He founded a band with his friend Tahribad-ı İsyan in 2008.
He has made a song for a Toyota ad.

Discography

Albums 
 ZENGBEJ

 MAMA'S PRELUDE
 MAMA (INTRO)
 İSTANBUL - (ft. Bayhan)
 HÜKÜM - (ft. İsmail Tuncbilek)
 İSKENDER 
 TATTO - (ft. Khontkar)
 GİRME KANIMA - (ft. Asil)
 ALEV ALEV - (ft. Ati242)
 SUÇ İŞLERİ BAKANI - (ft. Asil)
 DELALÊ
 BABA (OUTRO)

Singles and EPs 

 "ABİS"
 "Temizle" - Zen-G, Arda Gezer
 "Eyvallah" - Zen-G, Emcey, Burak Alkın
 "KIYAK" - Zen-G, Emza
 "2020" - Zen-G, Can VS
 "ALEV ALEV" - Zen-G, Ati242
 "GİRME KANIMA" - Zen-G, Asil
 "DELALÊ"
 "Tuzak" - Zen-G, Maho G
 "İmkansız Yok"
 "TATTO" - Zen-G, Khontkar
 "HARBİ FREESTYLE" - Zen-G, Burak Alkın
 "ELHAMDRİLLAH" - Zen-G

Duets 

 "Temizle" - Zen-G, Arda Gezer
 "Eyvallah" - Zen-G, Emcey, Burak Alkın
 "KIYAK" - Zen-G, Emza
 "2020" - Zen-G, Can VS
 "ALEV ALEV" - Zen-G, Ati242
 "GİRME KANIMA" - Zen-G, Asil
 "Tuzak" - Zen-G, Maho G
 "TATTO" - Zen-G, Khontkar
 "HARBİ FREESTYLE" - Zen-G, Burak Alkın
 "Bi De Bana Sor" - Arda Gezer, Kaya Giray, Zen-G
 "Flowjob" - Ati242, Zen-G
 "Boulevard" - Berrin Keklikler, Zen-G
 "Favela" - Grogi, Asil, Zen-G

References 

Living people
1994 births
Turkish rappers
Turkish hip hop
Turkish lyricists
Turkish male singers